Jean-Claude Probst (born 7 December 1935), known professional as Jean-Claude Casadesus, is a French conductor.

Biography
Casadesus was born in Paris on 7 December 1935, the son of actress Gisèle Casadesus and her husband Lucien Pascal.  He began his career as a percussionist before studying composition and conducting with Pierre Dervaux and Pierre Boulez.
 
In 1969 he was hired as assistant conductor at the Paris Opéra and the Opéra-Comique.  In 1971 he co-founded the Orchestre National des Pays de la Loire with Pierre Dervaux, and acted as Dervaux's deputy there until 1976.  In 1976 he became principal conductor of the Orchestre national de Lille, performing concerts locally and internationally.  He directed the French Youth Orchestra in 2007.

Personal life
Jean-Claude has been married twice and has three children, his only daughter Caroline (b. 30 October 1962) is an opera singer and his first born son Sebastian Copeland (b. 3 April 1964) is a film director whose mother is Pénélope Copeland, his second son Olivier (b. 2 September 1970) is an actor whose mother is Anne Sevestre.

Distinctions
 Commandeur de la Légion d'honneur
 Commandeur de l'Ordre national du Mérite
 Commandeur des Arts et Lettres
 Commandeur de l'Ordre d'Orange-Nassau
 Officier de l'Ordre de Léopold de Belgique
 Chevalier des Palmes Académiques

In 2004, the Victoires de la musique classique awarded him a victory of honour.

Discography with l'Orchestre National de Lille
 Richard Wagner, Ouvertures et monologues célèbres, Le Vaisseau Fantôme, Tännhauser, Les Maîtres chanteurs de Nuremberg, La Walkyrie, avec José van Dam, Label Forlane
 Darius Milhaud, La Création du monde, Le Bœuf sur le toit, Suite Provençale, L'Homme et son Désir, Label Naxos
 Serge Prokofiev, Alexander Nevsky (Cantata), Lieutenant Kijé (Suite), Label Naxos
 Hector Berlioz, La Damnation de Faust, Label Naxos
 Hector Berlioz, Symphonie Fantastique, Label Harmonia Mundi
 Joseph Canteloube, Chants d'Auvergne, Label Naxos
 Gustav Mahler, Symphonies, Label Forlane
 Georges Bizet, Clovis et Clotilde - Te Deum, Label Naxos - Abeille Musique, 2010

Bibliography 
 Le plus court chemin d'un cœur à l'autre, Jean-Claude Casadesus, Éditions Stock

1935 births
Living people
École Normale de Musique de Paris alumni
French male conductors (music)
Commandeurs of the Légion d'honneur
Commanders of the Ordre national du Mérite
Grand Officers of the Ordre national du Mérite
Chevaliers of the Ordre des Palmes Académiques
Musicians from Paris
Jean-Claude
20th-century French conductors (music)
21st-century French conductors (music)
20th-century French male musicians
21st-century French male musicians